Tilopteridaceae is a brown algae family in the order Tilopteridales.

References

External links 
 

Brown algae families
Tilopteridales